Hakim Khoudi (born 16 July 1989) is an Algerian footballer who plays for USM El Harrach in the Algerian Ligue 2 as a defender.

References

External links

1989 births
Living people
Association football defenders
Algerian footballers
CR Belouizdad players
AS Aïn M'lila players
JSM Skikda players
Algerian Ligue Professionnelle 1 players
Algerian Ligue 2 players
21st-century Algerian people